Badger Mountain is a mountain summit in the South Park Hills of the Rocky Mountains of North America.

Badger mountain is the most prominent mountain of the Puma Hills area, overlooking nearby Wilkerson Pass. It borders the edge of the Lost Creek Wilderness. Badger Mountain road allows motor vehicles access to the summit.

See also

List of Colorado mountain ranges
List of Colorado mountain summits
List of Colorado fourteeners
List of Colorado 4000 meter prominent summits
List of the most prominent summits of Colorado
List of Colorado county high points

References

External links

Badger Mountain at bivouac.com

Mountains of Colorado
Mountains of Park County, Colorado
Pike National Forest
North American 3000 m summits